Alpaida truncata is a species of spider from the genus Alpaida. The species was originally described by Eugen von Keyserling in 1865. The species is widely distributed from Mexico to Argentina.

References

Araneidae
Taxa named by Eugen von Keyserling